The Maine Attorney General is the chief legal advisor and prosecutor of the State of Maine. The constitutional basis of the office is Article IX, Section 11 of the Maine Constitution, and the holder of the position is chosen biennially by the Maine Legislature in joint session. Maine is the only state to select its attorney general in such a manner. 

The powers of the Attorney General are derived from the Maine Revised Statues Annotated, Title 5, Chapter 9. These include representing the State in civil actions, investigating and prosecuting homicides, advising district attorneys, and providing written opinions on matters of law at the request of the Governor or the Legislature. The Attorney General is empowered to appoint deputy and assistant attorneys general, who serve at the Attorney General's pleasure.

List of Maine Attorneys General

References

External links
 Maine Attorney General official website
 Maine Attorney General articles at ABA Journal
 News and Commentary at FindLaw
 Maine Revised Statutes at Law.Justia.com
 U.S. Supreme Court Opinions - "Cases with title containing: State of Maine" at FindLaw
 Maine State Bar Association
 Maine Attorney General Janet T. Mills profile at National Association of Attorneys General
 News & reports at Maine Attorney General